Partula varia is a species of air-breathing tropical land snail, a terrestrial pulmonate gastropod mollusk in the family Partulidae. This species is endemic to Huahine, French Polynesia. It is now extinct in the wild.

References

External links

Fauna of French Polynesia
Partula (gastropod)
Gastropods described in 1832
Taxa named by William Broderip
Taxonomy articles created by Polbot